Michel J. Dion  (born February 11, 1954) is a Canadian former professional ice hockey goaltender who was active in the World Hockey Association and National Hockey League from 1975 to 1985. He also played minor league baseball before deciding on a career in professional hockey.

Playing career
Dion enjoyed a successful junior hockey career with the Montreal Bleu Blanc Rouge and initially hoped for a career as a professional baseball player. During the 1971 and 1972 seasons, Dion played professional baseball in the Montreal Expos' organization with the Cocoa Expos and with the West Palm Beach Expos. Eventually, he gave up on baseball in favour of hockey.

After playing his first two pro seasons with the NAHL's Mohawk Valley Comets, Dion joined the WHA's Indianapolis Racers in the second half of the 1975–76 season. His play in the last 31 games of the season earned Dion the Ben Hatskin Trophy as the league's top netminder.

After playing two years with the Cincinnati Stingers, Dion was claimed by the Quebec Nordiques in the Dispersal Draft following the WHA/NHL merger in 1979. Dion excelled in 50 games in Quebec, and kept them in many games late in the season when they were decimated by injuries.

Dion was traded to the Winnipeg Jets for cash in 1980-81 after abandoning his team during a game against the Boston Bruins.  In June 1981, he signed as a free agent with the Pittsburgh Penguins and enjoyed his best NHL season. Dion recorded 25 wins for the Pens in 1981-82 and was chosen to play in the NHL all-star game. He also starred in the opening round of the playoffs when Pittsburgh nearly upset the defending Stanley Cup champion New York Islanders. Dion was solid over the next two years but only played ten games in 1984–85. He spent most of the year in the American Hockey League before retiring from hockey.

Dion lives in Bluffton, South Carolina. He is a certified Master golf instructor with the USGTF. He is also currently an instructor at PGCC.

Career statistics

Regular season and playoffs

References

External links

1954 births
Baltimore Skipjacks players
Canadian ice hockey goaltenders
Cincinnati Stingers players
Ice hockey people from Quebec
Indianapolis Checkers (CHL) players
Indianapolis Racers draft picks
Indianapolis Racers players
Living people
Montreal Junior Canadiens players
Montreal Bleu Blanc Rouge players
National Hockey League All-Stars
People from Granby, Quebec
Pittsburgh Penguins players
Quebec Nordiques players
Undrafted National Hockey League players
Winnipeg Jets (1979–1996) players
People from Bluffton, South Carolina